Corey "Philly" Brown (born December 16, 1991) is a former American football wide receiver and return specialist. He was signed by the Carolina Panthers as an undrafted free agent in 2014. He played college football at Ohio State.

Early years
While attending Cardinal O'Hara High School in Springfield, Pennsylvania, Brown was one of the state's top performers in the sprinting events, with personal-bests of 10.54 seconds in the 100-meter dash and 21.18 seconds in the 200-meter dash.

College career
Brown played college football at Ohio State University from 2010 to 2013. In his four-year career at Ohio State, he started 35 of 48 games and recorded 145 receptions for 1,750 yards and 15 touchdowns.

Collegiate statistics

Professional career

Carolina Panthers

Brown was signed by the Carolina Panthers after going undrafted in the 2014 NFL Draft. On October 5, 2014, Brown recorded the first punt return touchdown for the Panthers since Steve Smith, Sr. in 2003 on a 79-yard touchdown return. In Week 11, against the Atlanta Falcons, Brown recorded his first receiving touchdown as an NFL player. Brown appeared in 13 games and had three starts in 2014. He  had 21 receptions for 296 receiving yards and two receiving touchdowns as a rookie.

In Brown's second season, the Panthers finished the season with a franchise-record 15–1 season. On the year, Brown had 31 catches for 447 yards and four touchdowns. 

In the NFC Championship against the Arizona Cardinals, he had four receptions for 113 receiving yards and one receiving touchdown in the 49–15 victory. On February 7, 2016, Brown was part of the Panthers team that played in Super Bowl 50. In the game, the Panthers fell to the Denver Broncos by a score of 24–10. In the Super Bowl, Brown had four catches for 80 yards, and was the Panthers' leading receiver in the game in terms of total receiving yards.

In the 2016 season, Brown recorded 27 receptions for 276 receiving yards and one receiving touchdown in 16 games, of which he started eight.

Buffalo Bills
On March 12, 2017, Brown signed a one-year contract with the Buffalo Bills. He was released on September 3, 2017. He was re-signed on October 3, 2017, but was released four days later.

Denver Broncos 
On July 27, 2018, Brown signed with the Denver Broncos. He was waived/injured by the Broncos on August 15, 2018, and was placed on injured reserve.

Career statistics

Regular season

Postseason

References

External links

Ohio State Buckeyes bio

1991 births
Living people
People from Upper Darby Township, Pennsylvania
Players of American football from Pennsylvania
American football wide receivers
American football return specialists
Ohio State Buckeyes football players
Carolina Panthers players
Buffalo Bills players
Denver Broncos players
Sportspeople from Delaware County, Pennsylvania